Komiljon Otaniyozov is an Uzbek instrumentalist, singer, songwriter and music composer. He is the People's artist of Uzbekistan. He has been an influential figure in Uzbek cultural life for almost five decades. Much of his most celebrated work dates from the 1930s and 1970s.

Komiljon Otaniyozov's lyrics have incorporated a variety of social, philosophical, and traditional life influences. Some of his lyrics have become part of everyday Uzbek vocabulary. While usually writes both the music and lyrics to his songs, he has also used lines from the poems of Ali-Shir Nava'i, Babur, Jami, and society's folklore in his songs.

Life 
Komiljon Otaniyozov was born in 1917 in Khorazm Region, Uzbekistan, then the Uzbek SSR, USSR. Komiljon Otaniyozov graduated from the state conservatory of Uzbekistan in 1956. He learned from Abdullayev Qurbonnazar and Matpano Khudoyberganov.

Professional career 
From 1936 until 1952, Komiljon Otaniyozov worked as an actor in national theatres in Khorazm. From 1949 on, he made concerts initially in Khorazm then throughout Uzbekistan. From 1957 to 1975, he worked as a single singer at the Uzbek State Philharmonic.

Throughout his long career, Otaniyozov has written and recorded hundreds of songs. As an musical composer, Komiljon Otaniyozov made some outstanding pieces of music such as  "Salom, senga Xorazmdan" (Greetings, from Khorazm), "Muborak", "Vatan", "Olqish", "Temir yoʻl", "Oʻzbekiston", "Xorazm".

References 

1917 births
Soviet male singers
Soviet male film actors
Uzbekistani male film actors
20th-century Uzbekistani male singers
20th-century Uzbekistani male actors
Uzbekistani composers
1975 deaths